Headset may refer to:

 Headset (audio), audio headphone(s), particularly with an attached microphone
 Head Set (band), an American alternative rock band
 Headset (bicycle part), a bicycle part that connects the fork to the frame
 Head-mounted display, a video display mounted on a head strap or helmet
 Headset, an electronica / hip-hop group of Dntel
 VR headset, a set that all-in-one includes the audio headphones, the microphone and a virtual-reality device

See also
 Handset